Everly was an American folk musical duo formed in Battle Ground, Washington in 2008 by friends Bethany Joy Lenz and Amber Sweeney. Their debut EP, Mission Bell, was launched on iTunes. The duo released a series of digitally released B Track albums that have been featured on The CW hit television series, One Tree Hill, on which Lenz was an actor and director.

On November 29, 2012, Lenz confirmed that Everly split and will no longer be making music.

History

Debut
Lenz and Sweeney formed Everly in 2008. On November 5, 2008, Everly released a three-song acoustic EP on iTunes entitled Mission Bell. The duo released the EP through music outlets, iTunes, Amazon and CD Baby. Mission Bell featuring "Home Is Me – You Are Mine," "Stars," and "Little Children," all written by Lenz and Sweeney. On November 15, 2008, the duo released three additional tracks added onto Mission Bell titled "Hotel Café," "Mrs. Scott," and "Scheming Star," and a bonus track titled "Karen's Café", which was a specifically altered version of "Hotel Café" for an episode of Lenz's television series One Tree Hill.

Mission Bell reached the No. 1 spot on CD Baby, an online music store specializing in the sale of physical compact discs and digital music downloads from independent musicians directly to consumers. The duo also digitally released an acoustic Christmas album in 2009 titled Fireside.

Everly on One Tree Hill
Lenz has performed a string of original tracks on One Tree Hill due to her character's ambitions to reestablish her music career. Everly had continued to use One Tree Hill as an avenue to promote their latest music.

In the episode titled "Even Fairy Tale Characters Would Be Jealous," Lenz's character Haley James Scott's friend Peyton Sawyer produces a USO concert at the military base where her brother is stationed. The concert also featured Lenz's then-husband Michael Galeotti's band Enation, the band Angels & Airwaves, and occasional One Tree Hill guest star and fellow musician Kate Voegele. After its airing, Everly's single Feel This rose to No. 14 on the iTunes folk charts and allowed them to maintain the No. 1 top seller spot on CD Baby for several weeks.

In the episode titled We Three (My Echo, My Shadow and Me), Karen's café is transformed into a glamorous nightclub with Lucas as its proprietor and Haley as the cabaret singer; Lenz premiered more songs featured in Everly's EP.

In the seventh season of One Tree Hill, Lenz re-released "Quicksand," a song originally written and performed by Lenz for her album with Epic. Her character then began her first solo tour, Flying Machine. In the fictional tour, songs written and performed by Everly were featured on the show while concurrently being released through iTunes and CD Baby.

Discography

EPs

Singles

Televised performances

See also
Bethany Joy Lenz
Bethany Joy Lenz discography

References

External links
 

American folk rock groups